USCWM may refer to: 

 U.S. Center for World Mission, a Christian mission organization founded by Ralph D. Winter, now known as Venture Center
 USCWM, the UN/LOCODE for Chatham, Virginia